Jon White may refer to:

Jon White, of Blind Mr. Jones
Jon Manchip White (1924–2013), Welsh American author
Jon White (rugby union) (born 1935), Australian rugby union player

See also
Jonathan White (disambiguation)
John White (disambiguation)